Raining Down Diamonds is the third of four albums released in 2005 by the musician Jandek. It was released by Corwood Industries (#0780) and is his 42nd overall. He is backed by fretless bass guitar.

Track listing

References

2005 albums
Jandek albums
Corwood Industries albums